Ásmundur Bjarnason (born 17 February 1927) is an Icelandic sprinter. He competed in the men's 100 metres at the 1952 Summer Olympics.

References

1927 births
Living people
Athletes (track and field) at the 1948 Summer Olympics
Athletes (track and field) at the 1952 Summer Olympics
Asmundur Bjarnason
Asmundur Bjarnason
Place of birth missing (living people)